George Matthews may refer to:

 George Matthews (soldier) (1726–1798), soldier and signatory of the 1790 Pennsylvania Constitution
 George E. Matthews (1855–1911), American publisher of the Buffalo Courier-Express
 George Matthews (musician) (1912–1982), American jazz trombonist
 George Matthews (journalist) (1917–2005), British political activist and editor of The Morning Star
 George Matthews (artist) (born 1924), Australian artist whose work featured in the 1953 inaugural exhibition in the New Gallery of Fine Art in Adelaide
 George Matthews (broadcaster), contemporary Canadian radio ice hockey commentator

See also
 George Mathews (disambiguation)